Isaia "Ice" Toeava (born 15 January 1986) is a professional rugby union player from New Zealand.

Early career
Toeava was born in Samoa but moved to New Zealand in 1994 to live with his grandmother. He attended De La Salle College, Mangere East, he played alongside Taniela Moa in the school's First XV rugby team. He represented New Zealand U-19 where he was named the IRB's Under-19 2005 player of the year. He played at second-five for New Zealand Under 19. Other early career highlights include playing second five for the Championship-winning Auckland Marist Under 21 side, coached by Peter Tubberty.

Career
Toeava played for the All Blacks and represented New Zealand in Sevens rugby.

In 2005 Toeava was a shock selection for the All Blacks Grand Slam tour at only 19 years of age. He had had no Super 14 experience, and limited Provincial experience with just eight games for Auckland, and only a solitary start at first-five against Northland.

He played his first-class rugby mainly at centre, wing and fullback. He played his provincial rugby for Auckland in the Air New Zealand Cup and was drafted to the Hurricanes in the 2006 Super 14 season. He played for the Blues for the 2007 season.

He was instrumental in the success of the Blues in the 2007 Super 14 season, scoring four tries and setting up many others from the outside centre position. He was later nominated for Rebel Sport Super 14 Player of the Year at the 2007 Steinlager Rugby Awards. 

Toeava played the final two games of the 2011 Tri-Nations tournament. At the 2011 Rugby World Cup, Toeava played in pool matches against Tonga (at left wing), Japan (at fullback) and Canada (coming of the bench in the second half).

In July 2012, Toeava signed a two-year contract with the Tokyo-based Canon Eagles.

In March 2016 Toeava joined Clermont as a medical joker to cover an injury crisis and has held his place at the powerful club. His form helped guide Clermont to the French Top 14 championship and to the lead in their pool of the Champions Cup in January 2017, before an arm injury that required surgery sidelined him for the rest of the season.

On 16 June 2020, Toeava signs for Top 14 rivals Toulon ahead of the 2020–21 season. On 25 November 2021, he signed for another French side Bayonne in the second-tier Pro D2 ahead of the 2021–22 season.

NZRU Annual Awards
 NZRU Age-Grade Player of the Year, 2005

New Zealand Representative Teams
 New Zealand Secondary Schools in 2003
 New Zealand Sevens rugby in 2005
 New Zealand Under 19 in 2005
 All Blacks in 2005–07, 2010

Career Notes
 Played every match in his first Super 14 season for the Hurricanes.
 Scored two tries against Northland in his only start of the season for Auckland in the 2005 Air New Zealand NPC.
 Received the 2005 IRB Under 19 Player of the Year award announced in November 2005 in Paris.
 Scored 62 points in four matches for New Zealand Under 19 at the IRB Under 19 World Championships in South Africa in 2005, including five tries and 37 points from the boot.

References

External links

Auckland Rugby profile
Statistics from Fox Sports
ESPN Scrum profile

1986 births
Living people
Samoan rugby union players
New Zealand rugby union players
Auckland rugby union players
Blues (Super Rugby) players
Hurricanes (rugby union) players
Yokohama Canon Eagles players
Kubota Spears Funabashi Tokyo Bay players
Rugby union centres
Rugby union fullbacks
New Zealand sportspeople of Samoan descent
Rugby union wings
New Zealand international rugby union players
World Rugby Awards winners
People from Tuamasaga
Expatriate rugby union players in Japan
New Zealand expatriate sportspeople in Japan
New Zealand expatriate rugby union players
People educated at De La Salle College, Māngere East